Let It Be Liza is a 2018 Russian drama film directed by Igor Kagramanov based on a script by Kagramanov himself and Yuri Glushenkov.

Plot 
Katya lives very modestly, with her husband and mother in a provincial town, and works at a local enterprise. Her mother Galina Stepanovna unexpectedly falls ill, but her act is even more unexpected   she decides to sign all her meager inheritance not to her daughter, but to her son, the girl's brother. Katya is ready to do anything to change this unfair, in her opinion, decision. But she herself does not notice how terrible the consequences of her rash actions can be.

Cast
 Yelena Makhova as Katya
 Natalia Pavlenkova as  Galina Stepanovna 
 Aleksey Rozin as Arthur
 Viktor Potapeshkin as Egor
 Irina Zheryakova as Varvara
 Sonya Rivkin as Alina
 Tatiana Selivyorstova as Tanya
 Leonid Klyots as episode

Production 
Filming took place in Kaluga in April 2017.

Awards and nominations
Prizes for the Best Actress (Makhova) and Best Cinematographer  (Ustinov) of the XII Cheboksary International Film Festival. Nominated for Best Kinotavr Debut 2018 (Kagramanov).

References

External links 
 
 «Кинотавр». Печёная свастика и временные трудности
 Игровой фильм «Пусть будет Лиза» в конкурсе фестиваля «Сталкер»

2018 films
2010s Russian-language films
Russian drama films
2018 drama films
Films set in Russia
Films shot in Russia